Marum is a town and a former municipality in the northeastern Netherlands. The municipality was merged into the municipality of Westerkwartier on 1 January 2019.

History 
Marum is located in the peat area, and was an agricultural village. It was first mentioned in 1385 and probably means village near the lake. In 1795, it was home to 351 people.

Marum started to industrialise in the early 20th century, the tram from Groningen to Drachten resulted in further growth. The construction of the A7 motorway has resulted in the development of a suburban town. In 2019, it ceased to be an independent municipality and was merged into Westerkwartier.

Former population centres 
Boerakker, Jonkersvaart, Lucaswolde, Marum, Niebert, Noordwijk, Nuis, De Wilp.

Notable people 
 Tjeerd van Dekken (born 1967), politician
 Aafje Looijenga-Vos (1928–2018), crystallographer

Gallery

References

External links

Westerkwartier (municipality)
Former municipalities of Groningen (province)
Populated places in Groningen (province)
Municipalities of the Netherlands disestablished in 2019